In the Whyte notation for the classification of steam locomotive wheel arrangement, a 2-6-6-4 is a locomotive with a two-wheel leading truck, two sets of six driving wheels, and a four-wheel trailing truck.  All 2-6-6-4s are articulated locomotives, of the Mallet or related simple articulated type.

Other equivalent classifications are:
UIC classification: (1'C)C2 (also known as German classification and Italian classification)
French classification: 130+032
Turkish classification: 34+35
Swiss classification: 3/4+3/5

The UIC classification is refined to (1'C)C2 for Mallet locomotives.

The 2-6-6-4 was a fairly late development, a product of the superpower steam concept, introduced by  the Lima Locomotive Works, which encouraged the use of large fireboxes supported by four-wheel trailing trucks.  Such a firebox could sustain a rate of steam generation to meet any demands of the locomotive's cylinders, even at high speed.  High speeds were certainly among the design goals for the 2-6-6-4; most of the type were intended for use on fast freight trains.

The first 2-6-6-4s built in the United States were for the Pittsburgh and West Virginia Railroad, and these were not high speed locomotives but rather mountain luggers.  They received three in 1934 and four more in 1937 and operated the 2-6-6-4s until 1953. 

The next of the type were a class of ten ordered by the Seaboard Air Line in 1935 and 1937.  These were high speed freight engines and were successful.  Upon dieselisation the road sold the locomotives to the Baltimore and Ohio Railroad in 1947, who operated them until 1953.

The final class of 2-6-6-4s was the Norfolk and Western Railway's class A, built starting in 1936. 43 were built until 1950 but were operated until 1959 to prepare the ending of steam power. The powerful 2-6-6-4s were capable of more than 5,000 drawbar horsepower at 45 mph (72 km/h) and could reach 70 mph (110 km/h), and could lug heavy coal trains.  They were used until dieselisation in 1959.  One locomotive, Norfolk and Western 1218, was preserved and in 1987 was restored to running order, running on excursions until 1991. Today it is on display at the Virginia Museum of Transportation. It is the only surviving 2-6-6-4 in the world.

In all, sixty 2-6-6-4s were constructed in North America.

References 
 Trains.com article on the 2-6-6-4 type.
 Jeffries, Lewis I., N&W: Giant of Steam (Rev. ed. 2005).
 Wrinn, Jim, Steam's Camelot: Southern and Norfolk Southern Excursions in Color (2000).

External links
picture of N&W 1218 pulling an excursion train in 1988
side view of N&W 1218 under steam in 1987
builder's photo of N&W 1212, engineer's side, Virginia Tech collection
builder's photo of N&W 1212, fireman's side, Virginia Tech collection

 
66,2-6-6-4